In the history of motion pictures in the United States, many films have been set in New York City, or a fictionalized version thereof.

The following is a list of films and documentaries set in New York, however the list includes a number of films which only have a tenuous connection to the city. The list is sorted by the year the film was released.

1900s
What Happened on Twenty-third Street, New York City (1901)
Electrocuting an Elephant (1903)
Coney Island at Night (1905)
The Thieving Hand (1908)

1910s
Regeneration (1915)
Lights of New York (1916)
Coney Island (1917)
The Delicious Little Devil (1919)

1920s
The Saphead (1920)
Manhatta (1921)
Manhandled (1924)
The Rag Man (1925)
Subway Sadie (1926)
East Side, West Side (1927)
The Jazz Singer (1927)
Lights of New York (1928)
The Cameraman (1928) (has a Scene at Coney Island)
The Crowd (1928) (has a Scene at Coney Island)
Speedy (1928) (has a Scene at Coney Island)
Lonesome (1928) (has a Scene at Coney Island)
Applause (1929)
The Broadway Melody (1929)
Gold Diggers of Broadway (1929)

1930s

The Divorcee (1930)
Reaching for the Moon (1930)
Street Scene (1931)
Sidewalks of New York (1931)
Central Park (1932)
The Heart of New York (1932)
Lawyer Man (1932)
Pack Up Your Troubles (1932)
42nd Street (1933)
The Bowery (1933)
Dancing Lady (1933)
Deluge (1933)
Dinner at Eight (1933)
Footlight Parade (1933)
Gold Diggers of 1933 (1933)
Hallelujah, I'm a Bum (1933)
Hold Your Man (1933)
The House on 56th Street (1933)
King Kong (1933)
Lady for a Day (1933)
Little Women (1933)
Son of Kong (1933)
It Happened One Night (1934)
Manhattan Melodrama (1934)
The Thin Man (1934)
Annie Oakley (1935)
Dangerous (1935)
If You Could Only Cook (1935)
A Night at the Opera (1935)
Romance in Manhattan (1935)
Adventure in Manhattan (1936)
The Great Ziegfeld (1936)
Libeled Lady (1936)
Mr. Deeds Goes to Town (1936)
My Man Godfrey (1936)
Dead End (1937)
Nothing Sacred  (1937)
The Toast of New York  (1937)
Topper  (1937)
Just Around the Corner (1938)
Professor Beware (1938)
There Goes My Heart (1938)
You Can't Take It with You (1938)
The Rage of Paris (1938)
5th Ave Girl (1939)
Bachelor Mother (1939)
Dark Victory (1939)
Rose of Washington Square (1939)
Streets of New York (1939)
Topper Takes a Trip (1939)
The Women (1939)

1940s

Beyond Tomorrow (1940)
City for Conquest (1940)
Edison the Man (1940)
I Love You Again (1940)
Lillian Russell (1940)
Little Nellie Kelly (1940)
Remember the Night (1940)
Babes on Broadway (1941)
Citizen Kane (1941)
The Devil and Miss Jones (1941)
Here Comes Mr. Jordan (1941)
Mr. Bug Goes to Town (1941)
Mr. & Mrs. Smith (1941)
The Strawberry Blonde (1941)
Ziegfeld Girl (1941)
Cat People (1942)
Grand Central Murder (1942)
Holiday Inn (1942)
The Pride of the Yankees (1942)
Saboteur (1942)
Tales of Manhattan (1942)
Tarzan's New York Adventure (1942)
Woman of the Year (1942)
Yankee Doodle Dandy (1942)
Heaven Can Wait (1943)
The Seventh Victim (1943)
Arsenic and Old Lace (1944)
Bowery to Broadway (1944)
Buffalo Bill (1944)
Cover Girl (1944)
Going My Way (1944)
The Hairy Ape (1944)
Laura (1944)
The Bells of St. Mary's (1945)
Christmas in Connecticut (1945)
The Clock (1945)
The House on 92nd Street (1945)
The Lost Weekend (1945)
Scarlet Street (1945)
A Tree Grows in Brooklyn (1945)
 Week-End at the Waldorf (1945)
The Brute Man (1946)
The Dark Corner (1946)
Deception (1946)
House of Horrors (1946)
The Locket (1946)
The Bishop's Wife (1947)
Boomerang! (1947)
A Double Life (1947)
Down to Earth (1947)
Gentleman's Agreement (1947)
It Happened in Brooklyn (1947)
Kiss of Death (1947)
The Lady from Shanghai (1947)
Life with Father (1947)
Miracle on 34th Street (1947)
Boarding House Blues (1948)
Cry of the City (1948)
Easter Parade (1948)
Force of Evil (1948)
In the Street (1948)
Mr. Blandings Builds His Dream House (1948)
My Girl Tisa (1948)
The Naked City (1948)
Portrait of Jennie (1948)
Rope (1948)
Sorry, Wrong Number (1948)
Up in Central Park (1948)
Winter Meeting (1948)
Adam's Rib (1949)
C-Man (1949)
City Across the River (1949)
East Side, West Side (1949)
The Heiress (1949)
Holiday Affair (1949)
Jigsaw (1949)
Little Women (1949)
On the Town (1949)
Port of New York (1949)
The Window (1949)

1950s

1950
All About Eve (1950)
Black Hand (1950)
The Daughter of Rosie O'Grady (1950)
The Great Jewel Robber (1950)
Guilty Bystander (1950)
The Killer That Stalked New York (1950)
Mister 880 (1950)
Side Street (1950)
The Sleeping City (1950)
So Young, So Bad (1950)
The Tattooed Stranger (1950)
Where the Sidewalk Ends (1950)

1951
Detective Story
Fourteen Hours
I Can Get It for You Wholesale
Love Nest
Lullaby of Broadway
The Model and the Marriage Broker
The People Against O'Hara
St. Benny the Dip
Teresa
When Worlds Collide

1952
Anything Can Happen
The Belle of New York
Captive Women
Don't Bother to Knock
Dreamboat
Invasion, U.S.A.
Love Is Better Than Ever
The Marrying Kind
Million Dollar Mermaid
O. Henry's Full House
Park Row
The Story of Will Rogers
The Thief

1953
99 River Street
The Beast from 20,000 Fathoms
Daybreak Express
Dream Wife
Francis Covers the Big Town
The Glass Wall
Houdini
House of Wax
How to Marry a Millionaire
I Love Melvin
Little Fugitive
Main Street to Broadway
The Moon Is Blue
Pickup on South Street

1954
About Mrs. Leslie
Black Widow
The Country Girl
Executive Suite
The Glenn Miller Story
It Should Happen to You
Living It Up
On the Waterfront
Phffft
Rear Window
Sabrina
Witness to Murder
Woman's World

1955
Artists and Models
Blackboard Jungle
Daddy Long Legs
Guys and Dolls
Killer's Kiss
Marty
My Sister Eileen
The Naked Street
New York Confidential
The Seven Little Foys
The Seven Year Itch
The Shrike

1956
Bundle of Joy
The Catered Affair
The Great Man
The Harder They Fall
Lovers and Lollipops
The Man in the Gray Flannel Suit
Miracle in the Rain
The Opposite Sex
Patterns
The Solid Gold Cadillac
The Wrong Man

1957
12 Angry Men
An Affair to Remember
The Bachelor Party
Beau James
Designing Woman
Desk Set
Edge of the City
A Face in the Crowd
Funny Face
The Garment Jungle
The Giant Claw
A Hatful of Rain
A King in New York
Man of a Thousand Faces
N.Y., N.Y.
On the Bowery
Slaughter on Tenth Avenue
Sweet Smell of Success

1958
Bell, Book and Candle
The Colossus of New York
Cop Hater
I Married a Woman
Marjorie Morningstar
The Matchmaker
Stage Struck

1959
Ask Any Girl
The Best of Everything
The Five Pennies
The Gazebo
Imitation of Life
It Happened to Jane
The Last Angry Man
Middle of the Night
North by Northwest
Odds Against Tomorrow
Pillow Talk
Shadows
That Kind of Woman
The World, the Flesh and the Devil
Two Men in Manhattan

1960s

1960
All the Fine Young Cannibals
The Apartment
Bells Are Ringing
Butterfield 8
From the Terrace
Let's Make Love
Murder, Inc.
Pay or Die
Weddings and Babies

1961
Blast of Silence
Breakfast at Tiffany's
A Cold Wind in August
The Connection
The Hustler
Lover Come Back
Madison Avenue
Pocketful of Miracles
Portrait of a Mobster
Something Wild
West Side Story
The Young Savages

1962
Boys' Night Out
If a Man Answers
The Manchurian Candidate
Requiem for a Heavyweight
Satan in High Heels
That Touch of Mink
Two for the Seesaw

1963
An Affair of the Skin
America, America
Call Me Bwana
Come Blow Your Horn
The Cool World
Critic's Choice
The Wheeler Dealers
Homesick for St. Pauli
Love with the Proper Stranger
Mary, Mary
Sunday in New York
What's a Nice Girl Like You Doing in a Place Like This?

1964
Dear Heart
Empire
Fail Safe
A Global Affair
A House Is Not a Home
Marnie
The Pawnbroker
The Troublemaker
The World of Henry Orient

1965
Andy
Bad Girls Go to Hell
How to Murder Your Wife
Mirage
Promise Her Anything
A Thousand Clowns
Three Rooms in Manhattan
Who Killed Teddy Bear

1966
Any Wednesday
Chelsea Girls
A Fine Madness
The Group
A Man Called Adam
Mister Buddwing
Penelope
You're a Big Boy Now

1967
Barefoot in the Park
David Holzman's Diary
Enter Laughing
Fitzwilly
Games
How to Succeed in Business Without Really Trying
In Like Flint
The Incident
The President's Analyst
The Producers
The Tiger Makes Out
Up the Down Staircase
Valley of the Dolls
Wait Until Dark
Way Out
Who's That Knocking at My Door

1968
Andy Warhol's Flesh
Bye Bye Braverman
Candy
Coogan's Bluff
Destroy All Monsters
The Detective
For Love of Ivy
Funny Girl
Greetings
Madigan
Mingus: Charlie Mingus 1968
The Night They Raided Minsky's
No Way To Treat A Lady
The Odd Couple
P.J.
Planet of the Apes
Rosemary's Baby
The Secret Life of an American Wife
The Subject Was Roses
Sweet November
Symbiopsychotaxiplasm
What's So Bad About Feeling Good?
Where Were You When the Lights Went Out?

1969
Alice's Restaurant
The April Fools
Cactus Flower
Change of Habit
Coming Apart
Generation
Gidget Grows Up
Hello, Dolly!
John and Mary
Me, Natalie
Midnight Cowboy
Popi
Putney Swope
Some Kind of a Nut
Sweet Charity
The Thirteen Chairs
Topaz
Turn On to Love

1970s

1970
Andy Warhol's Trash
The Angel Levine
Beneath the Planet of the Apes
The Boys in the Band
Cotton Comes to Harlem
The Cross and the Switchblade
Diary of a Mad Housewife
Hercules in New York
Hi, Mom!
Husbands
I Never Sang for My Father
Jenny
Joe
The Landlord
Love Story
Lovers and Other Strangers
Loving
The Magic Garden of Stanley Sweetheart
Move
On a Clear Day You Can See Forever
The Out-of-Towners
The Owl and the Pussycat
The Projectionist
Puzzle of a Downfall Child
The Sidelong Glances of a Pigeon Kicker
Where's Poppa?

1971
The Anderson Tapes
B.S. I Love You
Bananas
Believe in Me
Born to Win
Carnal Knowledge
Cry Uncle!
Desperate Characters
The French Connection
The Gang That Couldn't Shoot Straight
The Hospital
Jennifer on My Mind
Klute
Lady Liberty
Little Murders
The Love Machine
Made for Each Other
A New Leaf
The Panic in Needle Park
Plaza Suite
The Pursuit Of Happiness
A Safe Place
Shaft
Some of My Best Friends Are...
Such Good Friends
Taking Off
The Telephone Book
They Might Be Giants
Who Is Harry Kellerman and Why Is He Saying Those Terrible Things About Me?
Who Killed Mary What's 'Er Name?
Who Says I Can't Ride a Rainbow!
You've Got to Walk It Like You Talk It or You'll Lose That Beat

1972
Across 110th Street
Ciao! Manhattan
Come Back, Charleston Blue
A Fan's Notes
Fritz the Cat
The Godfather
The Heartbreak Kid
The Hot Rock
Lady Sings the Blues
Last of the Red Hot Lovers
Portnoy's Complaint
The Possession of Joel Delaney
Rivals
Shaft's Big Score
Super Fly
To Find a Man
Up the Sandbox
The Valachi Papers
The War Between Men and Women

1973
40 Carats
Badge 373
Bang the Drum Slowly
Black Caesar
Cops and Robbers
From the Mixed-Up Files of Mrs. Basil E. Frankweiler
Godspell
Gordon's War
Heavy Traffic
Hell Up in Harlem
Hurry Up, or I'll Be 30
Jeremy
The Last Detail
Live and Let Die
Massage Parlor Murders
Mean Streets
Miracle on 34th Street
No Place to Hide
Serpico
The Seven-Ups
Shamus
Sisters
Soylent Green
The Stone Killer
Summer Wishes, Winter Dreams
The Way We Were
Willie Dynamite

1974
Alice in the Cities
Claudine
Crazy Joe
Death Wish
The Education of Sonny Carson
For Pete's Sake
The Gambler
The Godfather Part II
Harry and Tonto
Italianamerican
Law and Disorder
The Lords of Flatbush
Mame
The Sister-in-Law
The Super Cops
The Taking of Pelham One Two Three

1975
Aaron Loves Angela
Coonskin
Deadly Hero
Dog Day Afternoon
Funny Lady
The Happy Hooker
Hester Street
The Man in the Glass Booth
The Night That Panicked America
Once Is Not Enough
The Prisoner of Second Avenue
Report to the Commissioner
Sheila Levine Is Dead and Living in New York
The Sunshine Boys
Three Days of the Condor

1976
The Front
God Told Me To
Harry and Walter Go to New York
King Kong
Marathon Man
Network
The Next Man
Next Stop, Greenwich Village
The Ritz
Taxi Driver

1977
Andy Warhol's Bad
Annie Hall
Audrey Rose
Contract on Cherry Street
Emanuelle in America
End of the World
Exorcist II: The Heretic
The Goodbye Girl
Heroes
New York, New York
News from Home
Opening Night
The Rescuers
Roseland
Saturday Night Fever
The Sentinel
Short Eyes
Sorcerer
Thieves
The Turning Point

1978
American Hot Wax
Black Box
Bloodbrothers
Bye Bye Monkey
A Dream Is What You Wake Up From
Eyes of Laura Mars
Fingers
Flaming Hearts
Girlfriends
The Greek Tycoon
How to Pick Up Girls!
I Wanna Hold Your Hand
If Ever I See You Again
Interiors
King of the Gypsies
Matilda
Oliver's Story
The One and Only
Paradise Alley
Rush It
Slow Dancing in the Big City
Somebody Killed Her Husband
Superman
An Unmarried Woman
The Wiz

1979
All That Jazz
The Bell Jar
Bloodrage
Boardwalk
Chapter Two
The Driller Killer
El Super
From Corleone to Brooklyn
Going in Style
Hair
The In Laws
Kramer vs. Kramer
Last Embrace
Love at First Bite
Manhattan
Meteor
Natural Enemies
Nocturna: Granddaughter of Dracula
Rich Kids
The Rose
Something Short of Paradise
The Wanderers
The Warriors
Zombi 2

1980s

1980
Blank Generation
Can't Stop the Music
Cannibal Holocaust
City of the Living Dead
Contamination
Cruising
Defiance
The Dogs of War
Dressed to Kill
The Exterminator
Falling in Love Again
Fame
Fatso
The First Deadly Sin
Gloria
He Knows You're Alone
Hero at Large
Inferno
It's My Turn
The Jazz Singer
Just Tell Me What You Want
Love in a Taxi
Maniac
Night of the Juggler
Permanent Vacation
Raging Bull
Raise the Titanic
Stir Crazy
Superman II
Times Square
Tribute
Underground U.S.A.
Willie & Phil
Windows

1981
American Pop
Arthur
Brooklyn Bridge
The Chosen
Endless Love
Escape from New York
Eyewitness
The Fan
Fort Apache, The Bronx
The Four Seasons
Ghost Story
Heavy Metal
The House by the Cemetery
Huie's Sermon
Modern Problems
Ms. 45
My Dinner with Andre
Nighthawks
Nightmare
Only When I Laugh
Paternity
Prince of the City
Ragtime
Rich and Famous
Rollover
So Fine
They All Laughed
Vortex
Wolfen

1982
1990: The Bronx Warriors
Annie
Author! Author!
Basket Case
The Clairvoyant
Forty Deuce
Hanky Panky
Hey Good Lookin'
I, the Jury
I'm Dancing as Fast as I Can
The King of Comedy
Kiss Me Goodbye
The Last Horror Film
A Little Sex
Manhattan Baby
My Favorite Year
The New York Ripper
Night Shift
Q
Rocky III
Six Weeks
Smithereens
Sophie's Choice
Soup for One
Still of the Night
A Stranger Is Watching
Tempest
Tootsie
The Verdict
Vigilante
Wrong Is Right

1983
Angelo My Love
Born in Flames
Can She Bake a Cherry Pie?
City News
Copkiller
Daniel
Easy Money
Enormous Changes at the Last Minute
Escape from the Bronx
Exposed
The Hunger
Liquid Sky
Lovesick
Murder Me, Murder You
Of Unknown Origin
Romantic Comedy
Scarface
Staying Alive
Strange Invaders
Style Wars
The Survivors
Trading Places
Two of a Kind
Variety
Wild Style
Without A Trace

1984
Alphabet City
Beat Street
Body Rock
Broadway Danny Rose
The Brother From Another Planet
C.H.U.D.
The Cotton Club
Delivery Boys
Exterminator 2
Falling in Love
Fear City
The Flamingo Kid
Garbo Talks
Ghostbusters
Heartsounds
Johnny Dangerously
Klassenverhältnisse
The Lonely Guy
Mixed Blood
More Than Murder
Moscow on the Hudson
The Muppets Take Manhattan
Murder Rock
The Natural
Old Enough
Once Upon a Time in America
Over the Brooklyn Bridge
Perfect Strangers
The Pope of Greenwich Village
Rhinestone
Romancing the Stone
Special Effects
Splash
Stranger Than Paradise
Unfaithfully Yours

1985
After Hours
Brewster's Millions
Cat's Eye
A Chorus Line
Crossover Dreams
Deadly Messages
Death Wish 3
Desperately Seeking Susan
Fast Forward
Harem
Heaven Help Us
Honeymoon
Grace Quigley
Insignificance
Krush Groove
The Last Dragon
Out of the Darkness
Prizzi's Honor
The Protector
The Purple Rose of Cairo
Rappin'
Remo Williams: The Adventure Begins
Santa Claus The Movie
Sesame Street Presents: Follow That Bird
The Statue of Liberty
Streetwalkin'
The Stuff
Tenement
Too Scared to Scream
Turk 182!
The Way It Is
Year of the Dragon

1986
9½ Weeks
An American Tail
Blood Ties
Brighton Beach Memoirs
The Children of Times Square
Combat Shock
"Crocodile" Dundee
Detective School Dropouts
Eat and Run
F/X
Hannah and Her Sisters
Heartburn
Highlander
Joey
Jumpin' Jack Flash
Legal Eagles
The Money Pit
No Picnic
Off Beat
The Park Is Mine
Parting Glances
Power
Quiet Cool
She's Gotta Have It
Sid and Nancy
Sleepwalk
Something Wild
Playing for Keeps
Streets of Gold
Working Girls

1987
84 Charing Cross Road
Angel Heart
An Autumn's Tale
Baby Boom
Batteries Not Included
The Believers
A Better Tomorrow II
Beyond Therapy
The Brave Little Toaster
China Girl
Critical Condition
Dead of Winter
Deadly Illusion
Eddie Murphy Raw
Enemy Territory
Fatal Attraction
Forever, Lulu
Graveyard Shift
Heart
Hello Again
I Love N.Y.
Ishtar
Kiss Daddy Goodnight
Moonstruck
Nuts
Outrageous Fortune
The Pick-Up Artist
Planes, Trains and Automobiles
Radio Days
The Secret of My Success
Someone to Watch Over Me
The Squeeze
Story of a Junkie
Street Smart
Street Trash
Three Men and a Baby
Wall Street
Who's That Girl

1988
Another Woman
Arthur 2: On the Rocks
Beaches
Big
Big Business
Bright Lights, Big City
Call Me
Cocktail
The Boost
Coming to America
Crocodile Dundee II
Crossing Delancey
Five Corners
The House on Carroll Street
Last Rites
Maniac Cop
Married to the Mob
Me and Him
A New Life
Oliver & Company
Punchline
Scrooged
Shakedown
Short Circuit 2
Slime City
Spike of Bensonhurst
Sticky Fingers
Torch Song Trilogy
Working Girl

1989
Black Rain
Communion
Crimes and Misdemeanors
Do the Right Thing
The Dream Team
Family Business
Fear, Anxiety & Depression
Friday the 13th Part VIII: Jason Takes Manhattan
Fun Down There
Puppet Master
Ghostbusters II
Harlem Nights
The January Man
Longtime Companion
Look Who's Talking
New York Stories
The Phantom of the Opera
Rooftops
Sea of Love
See You in the Morning
She-Devil
Sidewalk Stories
Slaves of New York
Snake Eater
The Toxic Avenger Part II
True Believer
The Unbelievable Truth
Vampire's Kiss
When Harry Met Sally...
Who Shot Pat?
Weekend at Bernie's

1990s

1990
Alice
All the Vermeers in New York
The Ambulance
Betsy's Wedding
Blue Steel
The Bonfire of the Vanities
Cadillac Man
Come See the Paradise
Crazy People
Def by Temptation
Frankenhooker
The Freshman
Funny About Love
Ghost
The Godfather Part III
The Golden Boat
Goodfellas
Green Card
Gremlins 2: The New Batch
Jacob's Ladder
Joe Versus the Volcano
King of New York
Last Exit to Brooklyn
Look Who's Talking Too
Loose Cannons
Maniac Cop 2
Metropolitan
Misery
Mo' Better Blues
Paris Is Burning
Q & A
Quick Change
The Rescuers Down Under
Solar Crisis
State of Grace
Stella
Teenage Mutant Ninja Turtles
Three Men and a Little Lady

1991
29th Street
Age Isn't Everything
All I Want for Christmas
An American Tail: Fievel Goes West
Billy Bathgate
The Butcher's Wife
City Slickers
Curly Sue
Deceived
Delirious
F/X2
The Fisher King
Frankie and Johnny
Hangin' with the Homeboys
The Hard Way
Jungle Fever
The Linguini Incident
Married to It
Mobsters
New Jack City
Night on Earth
One Good Cop
Oscar
Other People's Money
Out for Justice
The Prince of Tides
Pushing Hands
Queens Logic
The Refrigerator
Regarding Henry
Shadows and Fog
Soapdish
Straight Out of Brooklyn
Strictly Business
The Super
Talkin' Dirty After Dark
Teenage Mutant Ninja Turtles II: The Secret of the Ooze
What About Bob?

1992
Bad Lieutenant
Boomerang
Broadway Bound
Freejack
Glengarry Glen Ross
Hellraiser III: Hell on Earth
Home Alone 2: Lost in New York
Husbands and Wives
In the Line of Duty: Street War
In the Soup
Juice
Just Another Girl on the I.R.T.
Laws of Gravity
Light Sleeper
Mac
Malcolm X
The Mambo Kings
Me Myself & I
Newsies
Night and the City
Scent of a Woman
Single White Female
A Stranger Among Us
This Is My Life
Used People
Zebrahead

1993
The Age of Innocence
A Bronx Tale
Carlito's Way
Coneheads
Even Cowgirls Get the Blues
For Love or Money
Freefall
Last Action Hero
Look Who's Talking Now
Manhattan Murder Mystery
Maniac Cop 3
Naked in New York
The Night We Never Met
The Pickle
Romeo Is Bleeding
The Saint of Fort Washington
Searching for Bobby Fischer
Six Degrees of Separation
Sleepless in Seattle
Sliver
Strapped
Super Mario Bros.
Teenage Mutant Ninja Turtles III
The Wedding Banquet
Weekend at Bernie's II
We're Back! A Dinosaur's Story
What's Love Got to Do with It
Who's the Man?

1994
Above The Rim
Amateur
Angie
Bullets Over Broadway
Car 54, Where Are You?
The Cowboy Way
Crooklyn
Death Wish V: The Face of Death
Fresh
Fresh Kill
Highlander III: The Sorcerer
The Hudsucker Proxy
I Like It Like That
It Could Happen to You
The Last Good Time
The Last Seduction
Léon: The Professional
Little Women
Love Affair
Miracle on 34th Street
Mrs. Parker and the Vicious Circle
Nadja
North
The Paper
Quiz Show
Rhythm Thief
The Scout
The Search for One-eye Jimmy
The Shadow
The Stand
A Troll in Central Park
Vanya on 42nd Street
What Happened Was
Wolf

1995
The Addiction
Balto
The Basketball Diaries
Batman Forever
Blue in the Face
Clockers
Denise Calls Up
Die Hard with a Vengeance
Dr. Jekyll and Ms. Hyde
Drunks
Flirt
Forget Paris
From the Mixed-Up Files of Mrs. Basil E. Frankweiler
Hackers
Headless Body in Topless Bar
The Indian in the Cupboard
It Takes Two
Jeffrey
Kids
Kiss of Death
Little Odessa
A Little Princess
Living in Oblivion
Mighty Aphrodite
Money Train
Party Girl
Rumble in the Bronx
Sabrina
Search and Destroy
Smoke
Stonewall
To Wong Foo, Thanks for Everything! Julie Newmar
The Usual Suspects
Vampire in Brooklyn

1996
The Associate
Basquiat
Bed of Roses
Bullet
City Hall
Comrades: Almost a Love Story
A Couch in New York
Daylight
Extreme Measures
The Daytrippers
Dunston Checks In
Eddie
Ed's Next Move
Eraser
Everyone Says I Love You
The First Wives Club
Flirting with Disaster
The Funeral
Girl 6
Gotti
Grace of My Heart
Harriet the Spy
I Shot Andy Warhol
I'm Not Rappaport
If Lucy Fell
Independence Day
James and the Giant Peach
Joe's Apartment
Killer Condom
Love Is All There Is
Maximum Risk
The Mirror Has Two Faces
Mistrial
Mother Night
Mrs. Winterbourne
Night Falls on Manhattan
One Fine Day
The Phantom
Ransom
She's the One
Sleepers
Sunset Park
The Sunshine Boys

1997
12 Angry Men
Addicted to Love
All Over Me
Fall
Jungle 2 Jungle
As Good as It Gets
The Beautician and the Beast
Chasing Amy
Commandments
Conspiracy Theory
Deconstructing Harry
The Devil's Advocate
The Devil's Own
For Richer or Poorer
Donnie Brasco
The Fifth Element
Fools Rush In
Henry Fool
Highball
Hoodlum
Hurricane Streets
Incognito
Kiss Me Guido
Men in Black
Mimic
Mr. Jealousy
One Eight Seven
One Night Stand
The Peacemaker
Picture Perfect
Private Parts
The Real Blonde
Spawn
Titanic
Turbo: A Power Rangers Movie
Turbulence

1998
54
Antz
Armageddon
Belly
Blind Faith
Bongwater
Celebrity
The City
Deep Impact
Earthquake in New York
Frogs for Snakes
Gia
Godzilla
Great Expectations
Half Baked
He Got Game
Illuminata
Jaded
Just the Ticket
Last Days of Disco
Living Out Loud
Meet Joe Black
The Minion 
Nick Fury: Agent of S.H.I.E.L.D.
The Object of My Affection
Operation Delta Force 3: Clear Target
A Perfect Murder
Pi
A Price Above Rubies
Return to Paradise
Ride
Rounders
The Siege
Stepmom
The Substitute 2: School's Out
The Taking of Pelham One Two Three
U.S. Marshals
You've Got Mail

1999
The 24 Hour Woman
200 Cigarettes
 Aftershock: Earthquake in New York
Analyze This
Annie
The Astronaut's Wife
At First Sight
Being John Malkovich
The Best Man
Big Daddy
Black and White
The Bone Collector
Bringing Out the Dead
Cradle Will Rock
Cruel Intentions
Double Platinum
End of Days
Eye of the Beholder
Eyes Wide Shut
Flawless
For Love of the Game
Gloria
The Insider
Just Looking
Light It Up
The Matrix
Mickey Blue Eyes
Music of the Heart
The Ninth Gate
The Out-of-Towners
Oxygen
Payback
Simply Irresistible
Stuart Little
Summer of Sam
Sweet and Lowdown
The Thomas Crown Affair
Urban Menace

2000s

2000
The Adventures of Rocky and Bullwinkle
Agent Red
American Psycho
Autumn in New York
Bait
Bamboozled
Bless the Child
Boiler Room
Bookwars
Center Stage
Chinese Coffee
Coyote Ugly
Da Hip Hop Witch
Dark Days
Digimon: The Movie
Dinner Rush
The Family Man
Finding Forrester
Frequency
Hamlet
Happy Accidents
Highlander: Endgame
The Intern
Keeping the Faith
Little Nicky
Loser
Miss Congeniality
The Prince of Central Park
Requiem for a Dream
Shaft
Small Time Crooks
Urbania
X-Men
The Yards

2001
15 Minutes
61*
A.I.: Artificial Intelligence
Acts of Worship
Ali
The Believer
The Caveman's Valentine
Cruel Intentions 2
The Curse of the Jade Scorpion
Don't Say a Word
Double Take
Downtown 81
Final Fantasy: The Spirits Within
Glitter
Head Over Heels
Kate & Leopold
Kissing Jessica Stein
K-PAX
The Next Big Thing
The Royal Tenenbaums
Serendipity
Sidewalks of New York
Someone Like You
Tart
Town & Country
Vanilla Sky
The Young Girl and the Monsoon
Zoolander

2002
25th Hour
Ash Wednesday
Bomb the System
Brown Sugar
Catch Me If You Can
Changing Lanes
City by the Sea
Death to Smoochy
Deuces Wild
Divine Secrets of the Ya-Ya Sisterhood
Gangs of New York
Get A Clue
The Guru
Hollywood Ending
Igby Goes Down
Life or Something Like It
Maid in Manhattan
Manito
Men in Black II
Mr. Deeds
Paid in Full
Panic Room
People I Know
Phone Booth
Raising Victor Vargas
Roger Dodger
Spider-Man
Stuart Little 2
Sweet Home Alabama
Two Weeks Notice
Unfaithful
Washington Heights

2003
Anger Management
Anne B. Real
Daredevil
Down with Love
Duplex
Elf
Homeless to Harvard: The Liz Murray Story
Marci X
Honey
How to Lose a Guy in 10 Days
In America
In the Cut
Kal Ho Naa Ho
Kangaroo Jack
Kill the Poor
Love the Hard Way
Nikos the Impaler
Something's Gotta Give
Uptown Girls
What a Girl Wants
X2

2004
13 Going on 30
Alfie
Along Came Polly
Anacondas: The Hunt for the Blood Orchid
Birth (film)
Confessions of a Teenage Drama Queen
The Day After Tomorrow
Devil Man
Eternal Sunshine of the Spotless Mind
Fahrenheit 9/11
FahrenHYPE 9/11
Flyboys
The Forgotten
Heights
Hellboy
In Good Company
Jersey Girl
Lbs.
Laws of Attraction
Little Black Book
The Manchurian Candidate
Maria Full of Grace
Melinda and Melinda
Mysterious Skin
New York Minute
P.S.
Raising Helen
Rick
Seed of Chucky
She Hate Me
Sky Captain and the World of Tomorrow
Spider-Man 2
Taxi
The Terminal

2005
Angel Rodriguez
Chasing Ghosts
Cinderella Man
Dark Water
Fantastic Four
Game 6
Get Rich or Die Tryin'
Hitch
The Honeymooners
In the Mix
The Interpreter
King Kong
Little Manhattan
Lord of War
Mad Hot Ballroom
Madagascar
Mr. & Mrs. Smith
Mutual Appreciation
Native New Yorker
Unleashed
Nicky's Game
The Perfect Man
Prime
The Producers
Rent
The Sisters
The Squid and the Whale
Stay
Syriana
Two for the Money
War of the Worlds

2006
.45
16 Blocks
The 9/11 Commission Report
Borat: Cultural Learnings of America for Make Benefit Glorious Nation of Kazakhstan
Bram Stoker's Dracula's Curse
A Cantor's Tale
Click
Coffee Date
Day Night Day Night
The Devil Wears Prada
Everyone's Hero
Disaster Zone: Volcano in New York
Factory Girl
Fifty Pills
A Guide to Recognizing Your Saints
Inside Man
Jaan-E-Mann
Just Like the Son
Just My Luck
Kabhi Alvida Naa Kehna
My Super Ex-Girlfriend
Night at the Museum
The Night Listener
The Pink Panther
Puccini for Beginners
Shortbus
Vettaiyaadu Vilaiyaadu
The Wild
World Trade Center
X-Men: The Last Stand

2007
1408
Across the Universe
American Gangster
August Rush
Awake
Bee Movie
Brooklyn Rules
The Bourne Ultimatum
Enchanted
Fantastic Four: Rise of the Silver Surfer
Highlander: The Source
I Am Legend
I Now Pronounce You Chuck & Larry
Khuda Kay Liye
Live Free or Die Hard
Music and Lyrics
The Nanny Diaries
No Reservations
P.S. I Love You
Perfect Stranger
Purple Violets
Reign Over Me
Resident Evil: Extinction
Rush Hour 3
Spider-Man 3
Suburban Girl
Ta Ra Rum Pum
TMNT
WdeltaZ
We Own The Night

2008
27 Dresses
Alone in the Dark II
American Loser
Batman: Gotham Knight
Beautiful Losers
Bolt
Cloverfield
The Day The Earth Stood Still
Deception
Definitely, Maybe
Disaster Movie
Doubt
Ghost Town
The Happening
Hellboy II: The Golden Army
Hookers In Revolt
How to Lose Friends & Alienate People
The Incredible Hulk
Jumper
Madagascar: Escape 2 Africa
Made of Honor
Max Payne
Meet Dave
Miracle at St. Anna
Mirrors
My Sassy Girl
Nick & Norah's Infinite Playlist
Nothing Like the Holidays
NYC: Tornado Terror
Pride and Glory
Punisher: War Zone
Righteous Kill
Iron-Man
Sex and the City
Synecdoche New York
The Visitor
The Wackness
What Happens in Vegas
You Don't Mess with the Zohan

2009
2012
Adam
Bride Wars
Brooklyn's Finest
City Island
Cloudy with a Chance of Meatballs
Confessions of a Shopaholic
Dance Flick
Eden of the East: The King of Eden
Fighting
G.I. Joe: The Rise of Cobra
The Hungry Ghosts
The International
Julie & Julia
Kurbaan
New York
New York, I Love You
Night at the Museum: Battle of the Smithsonian
Notorious
The Other Woman
Precious: Based on the Novel Push by Sapphire
The Proposal
State of Play
The Taking of Pelham 1 2 3
Transformers: Revenge of the Fallen
Veronika Decides to Die
Watchmen
Whatever Works

2010s

2010
All Good Things
Anjaana Anjaani
The Back-up Plan
Black Swan
Boy Wonder
Cool Dog
Cop Out
Date Night
Eat Pray Love
Fair Game
Five Minarets in New York
The Four-Faced Liar
Get Him to the Greek
Gulliver's Travels
happythankyoumoreplease
Iron Man 2
It's Kind of a Funny Story
Just Wright
Kick-Ass
Last Night
Letters to Juliet
Morning Glory
My Name Is Khan
The Other Guys
Percy Jackson & the Olympians: The Lightning Thief
Red
Remember Me
Salt
The Search for Santa Paws
Sex and the City 2
Sorcerer's Apprentice
Step Up 3D
The Switch
Tiny Furniture
The Town also filmed in Chicago, Illinois, Boston, Massachusetts and Los Angeles, California
Twelve
Wall Street: Money Never Sleeps
When in Rome

2011
13
The Adjustment Bureau
Arthur
Beastly
Born to Be a Star
Captain America: The First Avenger
Dream House
Extremely Loud and Incredibly Close
Friends with Benefits
Limitless
Margaret
Margin Call
Meanwhile
Mr. Popper's Penguins
New Year's Eve
Night of the Living Dead: Origins 3D
Our Idiot Brother
The Pill
The Resident
Shame
Sharpay's Fabulous Adventure
The Sitter
The Smurfs
Something Borrowed
Tower Heist
Union Square

2012
2 Days in New York
The Amazing Spider-Man
Arbitrage
The Avengers
The Bourne Legacy
The Dark Knight Rises
Diary of a Wimpy Kid: Dog Days
The Dictator
English Vinglish
Forgetting the Girl
Frances Ha
Freelancers
Journey 2: The Mysterious Island
Lola Versus
Madagascar 3: Europe's Most Wanted
Man on a Ledge
Men in Black 3
Petunia
Premium Rush
Red Hook Summer
Safe
The Unspeakable Act
Wanderlust
What Maisie Knew
Keep the Lights On

2013
American Hustle
Anchorman 2: The Legend Continues
Atlantic Rim
Begin Again
Blue Jasmine
Broken City
Chinese Puzzle
Dead Man Down
Empire State
Generation Um
Inside Llewyn Davis
Kick-Ass 2
Kill Your Darlings
London, Paris, New York
The Mortal Instruments: City of Bones
Now You See Me
Oblivion
Percy Jackson: Sea of Monsters
Pokémon the Movie: Genesect and the Legend Awakened
Paranoia
Side Effects
Spiders 3D
The Great Gatsby
The Immigrant
The Inevitable Defeat of Mister and Pete
The Secret Life of Walter Mitty
The Smurfs 2
The Wolf of Wall Street
Third Person
World War Z

2014
5 Flights Up
5 to 7
The Amazing Spider-Man 2
The Angriest Man in Brooklyn
Angry Video Game Nerd: The Movie
Annie
Before We Go
Birdman
The Cobbler
Da Sweet Blood of Jesus
Deliver Us From Evil
The Disappearance of Eleanor Rigby
The Drop
Heaven Knows What
John Wick
The Last Five Years
Left behind
Listen Up Philip
The Longest Week
Love Is Strange
Lucy
Mania Days
Match
A Most Violent Year
Mr. Peabody & Sherman
Night at the Museum: Secret of the Tomb
I Origins
The Other Woman
Penguins of Madagascar
PK
Predestination
St. Vincent
Scumbag Hustler
The Seven Five
Sharknado 2: The Second One
She's Funny That Way
Teenage Mutant Ninja Turtles
That Awkward Moment
Time Out of Mind
Top Five
Two Night Stand
A Walk Among the Tombstones
Welcome to New York
While We're Young
Whiplash
Winter's Tale

2015
About Ray
An Act of War
Avengers: Age of Ultron
A Very Murray Christmas
The Big Short
Brooklyn
Carol
Fantastic Four
Focus
The Intern
Love Live! The School Idol Movie
Mistress America
The Night Before
Pay the Ghost
Pixels
Queen of Earth
Run All Night
Sleeping with Other People
Staten Island Summer
Ted 2
Trainwreck
The Walk

2016
Abacus: Small Enough to Jail
Cafe Society
Carrie Pilby
Captain America: Civil War
Catfight
Collateral Beauty
Doctor Strange
Fantastic Beasts and Where to Find Them
Ghostbusters
Hands of Stone
Havenhurst
How to Be Single
Manhattan Night
Money Monster
Nerve
Nine Lives
Norm of the North
Patriots Day
The Secret Life of Pets
Sully
Tallulah
Teenage Mutant Ninja Turtles: Out of the Shadows
White Girl

2017
9/11
Beach Rats
The Boy Downstairs
Bushwick
Dean
The Fate of the Furious
Going in Style
Good Time
Golden Exits
Gotti
The Greatest Showman
The Incredible Jessica James
Jerry Before Seinfeld
John Wick: Chapter 2
Lady Bird
Landline
The Meyerowitz Stories
The Only Living Boy in New York
Person to Person
Resident Evil: Vendetta
Return to Montauk
Roxanne Roxanne
Spider-Man: Homecoming
Where Is Kyra?
Wonder Wheel
Wonderstruck

2018
After Everything
Avengers: Infinity War
Can You Ever Forgive Me?
The Commuter
Detective Chinatown 2
The First Purge
Green Book
Greta
I Feel Pretty
If Beale Street Could Talk
Ocean's 8
Second Act
Set It Up
Spider-Man: Into the Spider-Verse

2019
21 Bridges
The Assistant
Avengers: Endgame
The Farewell
The Goldfinch
Good Posture
Hustlers
The Irishman
Isn't It Romantic
John Wick: Chapter 3 – Parabellum
The Lego Movie 2: The Second Part
Little Women
Marriage Story
A Rainy Day in New York
The Secret Life of Pets 2
Someone Great
Spider-Man: Far From Home
The Sun Is Also a Star
Uncut Gems
The Upside

2020s

2020
The Broken Hearts Gallery
The King of Staten Island
My Salinger Year
On the Rocks
Shiva Baby
Soul
Vampires vs. the Bronx

2021
Clifford the Big Red Dog
Coming 2 America
In the Heights
New York Ninja
Spider-Man: No Way Home
Tick, Tick... Boom!
To All the Boys: Always and Forever
Tom & Jerry
The Woman in the Window
West Side Story

2022
Better Nate Than Ever
Blue's Big City Adventure
Doctor Strange in the Multiverse of Madness
Fantastic Beasts: The Secrets of Dumbledore
Luckiest Girl Alive
Lyle, Lyle, Crocodile
Marry Me
Moonfall
Morbius

2023
Scream VI

References

New York City
Films set in New York City